Todd Vaughn Devoe (born April 5, 1980) is a former American football wide receiver. He was signed by the Baltimore Ravens as an undrafted free agent in 2003. He played college football at the University of Central Missouri.

Devoe was traded to the Command by the Chicago Rush on July 2, 2011 in change for future considerations.

Devoe was also a member of the Miami Dolphins, Tennessee Titans, Denver Broncos Toronto Argonauts, and Chicago Rush.

External links
Just Sports Stats

1980 births
Living people
Players of American football from Fort Lauderdale, Florida
American football wide receivers
American players of Canadian football
Canadian football wide receivers
Central Missouri Mules football players
Baltimore Ravens players
Cologne Centurions (NFL Europe) players
Miami Dolphins players
Tennessee Titans players
Denver Broncos players
Toronto Argonauts players
Arizona Rattlers players
Chicago Rush players
Kansas City Command players
Kansas City Renegades players